"Under African Skies" is a song by the American singer-songwriter Paul Simon. It was the fifth and final single from his seventh studio album, Graceland (1986), released on Warner Bros. Records. The song features guest vocals from singer Linda Ronstadt.

Background
"Under African Skies" originated in later recording sessions for Graceland. Simon flew over several South African musicians to New York to complete the record three months after the original sessions in Johannesburg, paying them triple union rates in order to lure them to record, as many did not know who he was. He also offered writer's royalties to those who he felt had contributed particularly to the song's compositions. These sessions also resulted in the lead single, "You Can Call Me Al".

Cash Box said that "Ronstadt provides angelic harmonies to Simon's inimitable vocal stylings."

Personnel
Paul Simon—lead vocals, guitar
Linda Ronstadt—additional vocals
Ray Phiri, Adrian Belew—guitar
Bakithi Kumalo—bass
Isaac Mtshali—drums
Ralph MacDonald, James Guyatt—percussion

References

Sources

 
 

Songs about Africa
1987 singles
Paul Simon songs
Songs written by Paul Simon
Song recordings produced by Paul Simon
Warner Records singles
1986 songs
Linda Ronstadt songs
1987 songs